Hayır Bey (sometimes spelled Kha'ir Bey or Kha'ir Beg) or Khayrbak (died 1522) ruled Egypt in the name of the Ottoman Empire from 1517 until his death in 1522. He was granted the position of governor by sultan Selim I of the Ottoman Empire for his help in the conquest of Egypt.

Being of Abkhazian origin, he was the former Mamluk governor of Aleppo who contributed to the Ottoman victory at the Battle of Marj Dabiq. After the Ottoman conquest of the Mamluks and the end of the Mamluk Sultanate, the grand vizier Yunus Pasha was made the governor of Egypt. However, after Ottoman sultan Selim I found out about Yunus Pasha's corruption in governing, consisting of bribery and extortion, Hayır Bey was entrusted with the governorship of Egypt.

His residence was the Amir Alin Aq Palace and he built the Amir Khayrbak Funerary Complex.

See also
 List of Ottoman governors of Egypt
 Battle of Marj Dabiq
 Ottoman conquest of the Middle East

References

Further reading
 

1552 deaths
Ottoman governors of Egypt
Year of birth unknown
People from the Ottoman Empire of Abkhazian descent
16th-century Ottoman governors of Egypt